= Lamba Kheda =

Lamba Kheda Lambakheda
- village
- Location within Madhya Pradesh Location within India
- Coordinates: 23.326331°N 77.403966°E
- Country: India
- State: Madhya Pradesh
- District: Bhopal
- Tehsil: Huzur

Population (2011)
  - Total: 3,908
- Time zone: UTC+5:30 (IST)
- ISO 3166 code: MP-IN
- Census code: 482365

Lamba Kheda is a village in the Bhopal district of Madhya Pradesh, India. It is located in the Huzur tehsil.

== History ==
Lamba kheda was named after Dr. Prithvi Singh Lamba. This area was given to Dr. Lamba by the government of Madhya Pradesh when he was posted in Bhopal. When Lamba donated this area, it was named after him, and became a village.

== Education ==
The Jai Narain College of Technology is located in New Chouksey Nagar, Lamba Kheda.

== Demographics ==
According to the 2011 census of India, Lamba Kheda has 806 households. The effective literacy rate (i.e. the literacy rate of population excluding children aged 6 and below) is 81.38%.

Demographics (2011 Census)
	Total	Male	Female
Population	3908	2058	1850
Children aged below 6 years	524	289	235
Scheduled caste	1100	560	540
Scheduled tribe	123	62	61
Literates	2754	1532	1222
Workers (all)	1394	1025	369
Main workers (total)	1237	967	270
Main workers: Cultivators	85	68	17
Main workers: Agricultural labourers	76	35	41
Main workers: Household industry workers	43	30	13
Main workers: Other	1033	834	199
Marginal workers (total)	157	58	99
Marginal workers: Cultivators	14	7	7
Marginal workers: Agricultural labourers	49	4	45
Marginal workers: Household industry workers	18	3	15
Marginal workers: Others	76	44	32
Non-workers	2514	1033	1481
